The 1902 Washington Agricultural football team was an American football team that represented Washington Agricultural College during the 1902 college football season. The team competed as an independent under head coach William L. Allen, who returned after a one-year absence, and compiled a record of 2–3.

Schedule

References

Washington Agricultural
Washington State Cougars football seasons
Washington Agricultural football